School bullying, like bullying outside the school context, refers to one or more perpetrators who have greater physical strength or more social power than their victim and who repeatedly act aggressively toward their victim. Bullying can be verbal or physical. Bullying, with its ongoing character, is distinct from one-off types of peer conflict. Different types of school bullying include ongoing physical, emotional, and/or verbal aggression. Cyberbullying and sexual bullying are also types of bullying. Bullying even exists in higher education. There are warning signs that suggest that a child is being bullied, a child is acting as a bully, or a child has witnessed bullying at school. 

The cost of school violence is significant across many nations but there are educational leaders who have had success in reducing school bullying by implementing certain strategies. Some strategies used to reduce or prevent school bullying include educating the students about bullying, restricting of recording devices in the classroom, employing security technology, and hiring school safety officers. How schools respond to bullying, however, varies widely. Effects on the victims of school bullying include feelings of depression, anxiety, anger, stress, helplessness, and reduced school performance Empirical research by Sameer Hinduja and Justin Patchin involving a national sample of US youth have found that some victims of school bullying have attempted to commit suicide. 

This behavior is not a one-off episode; it must be repetitive and habitual to be considered bullying. Students who are LGBT, have parents of lower educational levels, are thought to be provocative, are perceived to be vulnerable, or are atypical or considered outsiders are at higher risk of being victimized by bullies. Baron (1977) defined such "aggressive behaviour as behaviour that is directed towards the goal of harming or injuring another living being who is motivated to avoid such treatment".

Historically, Thomas Hughes's 1857 novel Tom Brown's School Days details intensive school bullying, but the first major scholarly journal article to address school bullying appears to have been written in 1897. Research in school bullying has dramatically expanded over time, rising from 62 citations in the 90 years between 1900 and 1990, to 562 in the 4 years between 2000 and 2004. Since 2004, research on school bullying has mushroomed.

Criteria 
Bullying is a subcategory of aggressive behavior that is characterised by hostile intent (the harm caused is deliberate), imbalance of power (real or perceived power inequality between bully and victim), and repetition over a period of time. More ordinary types of student-student conflicts, which are sometimes part of everyday school life, are not associated with an imbalance of power. In contrast to more ordinary conflicts, school bullying can severely harm victimized students.

Power imbalance 
By definition, bullying involves an imbalance of power. A bully has power over another student because of factors such as size, gender, age, standing among peers, and/or assistance by other students.  Among boys, bullying tends to involve differences in strength; among girls bullying is more focused on differences in physical appearance, emotional life, and/or academic status.

Some bullies target peers with physical impairments, such as speech impediments (e.g., stuttering). Many stutterers experience some degree of bullying, harassment, or ridicule from peers and, sometimes, teachers.

Warning signs 
Signs that a child is being bullied may include: unexplainable injuries, symptoms of anxiety and post-traumatic stress, lost or destroyed clothing, changes in eating habits, declining grades, continual school absences, self-harm, suicidal ideations, and becoming overly apologetic.

Signs that a child is bullying others may include: getting into physical or verbal fights, getting sent to the principal's office frequently, having friends who bully others, and becoming increasingly aggressive in normal activities.

Signs that a child has witnessed bullying include: poor school behavior, emotional disturbance, depression, post-traumatic stress, drug and alcohol abuse, and suicidal ideation.

Control of bullying 
There are two main methods employed in controlling bullying: Prevention (acting before something happens) or reaction (acting when something is happening or has just happened).

Preventative solutions may include:

 Education: The education of students, parents, and teachers as to what constitutes bullying may help people understand the harmful nature of bullying. Teachers, school bus drivers, and other school professionals are taught how and when to intervene. Examples of activities used to teach students about bullying include: presentations, role-play, discussions about identifying and reporting bullying, teaching bystanders how and when to help, use of arts and crafts to build understanding of the effects of bullying, and classroom meetings to talk about peer relations. A systematic review found that bullying is an indicator for later criminal behaviour, regardless of other major childhood risk factors, suggesting that anti-bullying programmes may be viewed as a form of early crime prevention.
 Restrictions on recording devices: It has been suggested that the use of mobile phones can lead to an increase in cyberbullying, which is why some schools have banned them throughout the school day. 
 Security technologies: Schools may opt to install video cameras to monitor behaviour. However, skeptics argue that cameras may invade the students' privacy, especially if lax restrictions on the longevity of, and access to, the recordings leads to their misuse. 
 Guards in the school: Schools may choose to employ internal security guards or watchmen to ensure the students' safety. Experts believe that the use of security guards inside the schools may assist in reducing incidents of bullying as the guards get to know the students and who may then be able to predict and prevent issues before they arise.

The recommended reactions to cases of bullying are manifold, and various methods may be called for, depending on the type of bullying, and the people who are involved. Some suggestions for appropriate reaction are:
 Avoid rigid confrontations: It is recommended that bullies not be met with physical violence, to avoid contributing to promoting the apparition of violent environments in society. 
 Reports of the witnesses: Witnesses, whether known to the victim or not, are an important source of information in cases of bullying. It is recommended that anonymity be maintained where possible. 
 Intervention by a bystander: It is recommended that bystanders, and other third persons, avoid intervening in a conflict situation, due to their potential to aggravate the situation.
 Parental response: Experts advise that involved parents avoid talking directly to each other. Instead it is recommended to contact the school and allow the appropriate school personnel to take action, assume responsibility, and act as a mediator.
 Teacher response: Teacher interventions are considered important in many anti-bullying programs. In many countries teachers have a legal obligation to prevent their students from harm. Teachers can intervene by using authority-based interventions, by using non-punitive approaches to bullying, by supporting victims, and by involving other teachers or professionals. Some other teacher interventions have been found to be helpful in reducing bullying. These interventions include clearly pointing out boundaries, making it clear that the behavior exhibited is not acceptable, and involving school principals. Discussing school bullying and the associated negative consequences with the entire class has also been found to be helpful in reducing bullying. 
 Suspension and Expulsion: Where no other solution for bullying is working, or in cases where the bullying is very severe, it maybe necessary to suspend or expel the offender. Severe measures such as detention, expulsion, and suspension could however also have iatrogenic effects and increase aggression.
 Moving: In cases that are more difficult to solve, the victim may consider a change of institution or even moving with his or her family to another location.
 Psychosocial support: After the bullying ends, victims of bullying may require support, such as help with making new friends and/or taking up new activities.

Types of bullying 
There are a number of ways in which school bullying takes place. These include verbal, physical, psychological, cyber, and sexual bullying. Direct bullying refers to an open physical or verbal attack on a victim. Indirect bullying is more subtle and harder to detect, but involves one or more forms of relational aggression, including social isolation via intentional exclusion, spreading rumors to defame the target's character or reputation, making faces or obscene gestures behind the target's back, and manipulating friendships or other relationships. Pack bullying is bullying undertaken by a group. There is evidence that pack bullying was more common in high schools than in lower grades and lasts longer than bullying undertaken by individuals.

Physical 

Physical bullying is any unwanted physical contact between the bully and the victim. This is one of the most easily identifiable forms of bullying. Examples include: fighting, hazing, headlocks, inappropriate touching, kicking, pinching, poking, hair pulling, punching, pushing, slapping, spitting, stalking, or making unwanted and persistent eye contact with a victim, spilling liquids onto a victim, throwing small and lightweight objects at a victim, teasing, threatening, tickling, using weapons including improvised ones, theft and/or damaging of personal belongings.

Emotional 

Emotional bullying is any form of bullying that causes damage to a victim's psyche and/or emotional well-being. Examples include: spreading malicious rumors about people, "ganging up" on others (this could also be considered physical bullying), ignoring people (e.g. the silent treatment or pretending the victim is non-existent), provoking others, belittling or saying hurtful things (which are also forms of verbal bullying).

Verbal 

Verbal bullying are slanderous statements or accusations that cause the victim undue emotional distress. Examples include: foul language or (profanity) directed at the victim; using derogatory terms or deriding the person's name; commenting negatively on someone's looks, clothes, body, etc., (personal abuse); tormenting, harassing, mocking and belittling, threatening to cause harm, taunting, teasing, and making inappropriate sexual comments.

Cyberbullying 

Coupled with the increasing use of computers and the internet, the use of such technology and social media has moved some bullying from the schoolyard to the internet. According to the website Stop Cyberbullying, schools experience difficulties in controlling off-campus bullying due to the perception that their role stops at the gates of the schoolyard. Schools are under pressure to not exceed their authority and to avoid violating students' right to free speech. Suggestions have been made that principals act to include cyberbullying in their code of ethics, allowing disciplining of bullying outside of school facilities.  According to Professor Bernard James, "the timidity of educators in this context of emerging technology is working in the advantage of the bullies." Educators do appear to have support from the students. For example, three high school students from Melville, New York, organized a Bullying Awareness Walk, where several hundred people turned out to show their support.

Researcher Charisse Nixon found that students do not reach out for help with cyberbullying for four main reasons:
 They do not feel connected to the adults around them
 The students do not see cyberbullying as an issue that is worth bringing forward
 They do not feel the surrounding adults have the ability to properly deal with the cyberbullying
 The teenagers have increased feelings of shame and humiliation regarding the cyberbullying.

Research suggests that cyberbullying is sometimes an extension of bullying already taking place elsewhere.
 Students who are cyberbullied have, in many cases, also been bullied in other ways before (e.g., physically or verbally at school). There are few students who are bullied exclusively over the Internet. Some cyber victims are physically stronger than cyber bullies, which leads these bullies to prefer online confrontations to face-to-face contact.

Sexual 

Sexual bullying is "any bullying behaviour, whether physical or non-physical, that is based on a person's sexuality or gender." A BBC Panorama questionnaire aimed at English teens aged 11 to 19 found that, of the 273 respondents, 28 had been forced to do something sexual, 31 had seen it happen to someone else, and 40 had experienced unwanted touching. U.K. government figures show that in the 2007–2008 school year, there were 3,450 fixed-period exclusions and 120 expulsions from schools in England due to sexual misconduct. This included incidents such as groping and using sexually insulting language. From April 2008 to March 2009, ChildLine counselled a total of 156,729 children, 26,134 of whom spoke about bullying as a main concern and 300 of whom spoke specifically about sexual bullying. Sexting cases are also on the rise and have become a major source of bullying. The circulation of explicit photos of those involved, either around school or on the internet, put the originators in a position to be scorned and bullied.

Bullying in higher education 
About 15 percent of college students claim to have been victims of bullying. The misconception that bullying does not occur in higher education began to receive attention after the suicide of college student Tyler Clementi. According to a recent study, around 21.5% of college students reported rarely being victims of cyberbullying while around 93.3% of students said they rarely bullied others.

Characteristics of bullies 
Several main categories of bullying have been identified. Coloroso noted that some bullies need to feel superior to others (the "confident bully"). Bullies with low self-esteem often try to bring others down (the "social bully"). Other bullies appear tough but are cowardly; they tend to want to be seen as tough (the "fully armored bully").

Other factors associated with being a bully is lower school performance and higher self-esteem.

Characteristics of victims 
Victims of bullying tend to be physically smaller, more sensitive, unhappy, cautious, anxious, quiet, and withdrawn. They are sometimes characterized as passive or submissive and might use self-depreciating or self-defeating humor styles. Possessing these qualities makes these individuals vulnerable, as they are seen as being less likely to retaliate.

Another risk factor for becoming a victim is low self-esteem; however, low self-esteem can also be a consequence of having been bullied. Victims of cyberbullying, on the other hand, may not have lower scores than uninvolved students but might have higher body-related self-esteem than both victims of traditional bullying and bullies.

Locations and contexts 
Bullying locations vary. Most bullying in elementary school happens on the playground. In middle school and high school, it occurs most often in hallways, which have little supervision. According to the U.S Department of Education's National Center for Education Statistics, more than 47% of victims report being bullied in hallways and stairways. Bus stops and bus rides to and from school can also be sites of bullying; children tend to view the driver as someone with no disciplinary authority.

Roles 

McNamee and Mercurio state that there is a "bullying triangle," consisting of the person doing the bullying, the victim, and the bystander. Conversely, the US Department of Health and Human Services divides the participants into 7 actors, consisting of the initial "triangle" plus those who assist, those who reinforce the actions of the bully, those who aren't involved but witness the bullying ("outsiders"), and those who come to the assistance of the victim after the fact ("defenders").

Complex cultural dynamics 
School bullying might not end with interaction between students; other dynamics may be visible within a school. Students may bully each other or others (teachers, staff, parents), but the students may also experience bullying from teachers or staff. These dynamics may also be in play between staff and teachers, parents and teachers, or any other combination thereof.

Effects 
As a result of bullying, victims may feel depressed, anxious, angry, stressed, helpless, out of control, and may experience a significant drop in school performance, or, in rare cases, commit suicide (bullycide). They tend to feel more lonely and have difficulties adjusting to school. Over the long term, they may feel insecure, lack trust, exhibit extreme sensitivity or hypervigilance, develop mental illnesses such as avoidant personality disorder or post-traumatic stress disorder (PTSD), or develop other health challenges. They may also desire revenge, sometimes leading them to torment others in return.

Anxiety, depression, and psychosomatic symptoms are common among both bullies and their victims. Alcohol and substance abuse are at risk for developing later in life. People suffering from depression often feel better when they talk to others about their lives; victims of bullying, however, may be reluctant to talk to others about their feelings because they fear being bullied for doing so, which can, in  turn, worsen their depression.

In the short term, bystanders who witnesses bullying may experience anger, fear, guilt, and sadness. If they are witness to regular episodes of bullying, they may begin to exhibit the same symptoms as the victims themselves.

While most bullies, in the long term, grow up to be emotionally functional adults, many have an increased risk of developing antisocial personality disorder, which is linked to an increased risk of committing criminal acts (including domestic violence). Bullies have been shown to have higher levels of loneliness and lower levels of adjustment to school.

Educational quality and outcomes 
The educational effects on victims of school violence and bullying are significant. Violence and bullying at the hands of students may make the victims afraid to go to school and interfere with their ability to concentrate in class or participate in school activities. It can also have similar effects on bystanders. Bullied students may miss classes, avoid school activities, skip school, or drop out of school altogether. Bullied students may also have lower grades, greater academic difficulties, and be less likely to anticipate going on to higher education. International analyses highlight the impact of bullying on learning outcomes, showing that bullying is related to lower achievement. Further, unsafe learning environments create a climate of fear and insecurity and a perception that teachers do not have control or do not care about the students, which reduces the quality of education for all.

Social and economic costs 
The 2006 UN World Report on Violence Against Children shows that victims of corporal punishment, both at school and at home, may develop into adults who are passive and over-cautious or aggressive. Being bullied is also linked to a heightened risk of eating disorders and social and relationship difficulties. A 1958 study of children born in England, Scotland, and Wales looked at 7,771 children who had been bullied at ages 7 and 11 and found that by age 50, those who had been bullied as children were less likely to have obtained school qualifications and were less likely to live with a spouse or partner or to have adequate social support. These victims also scored lower in tests designed to measure cognitive IQ and were more likely to report that they had poor health.

The economic impact of violence against children and adolescents is substantial. Youth violence in Brazil alone is estimated to cost nearly US$19 billion every year, of which US$943 million can be linked to violence in schools, while the estimated cost to the economy in the USA is US$7.9 billion a year. Studies show that school-related gender-based violence alone can be associated with the loss of one primary grade of schooling, which translates to an annual cost of around US$17 billion to low- and middle-income countries. In Cameroon, Democratic Republic of Congo, and Nigeria it is estimated that US$974 million, US$301 million, and US$1,662 million respectively are lost due to failures in the equal education of girls and boys, with violence in school listed as one of the key factors contributing to the under-representation of girls in education. In Argentina, the cost of early dropping out is estimated to be 11.4% of GDP, and in Egypt, nearly 7% of potential earnings is lost as a result of the number of children dropping out of school. It is not clear how much of these preceding losses may be attributable to school bullying.

Statistics 

According to the American Psychological Association, "40% to 80% of school-age children experience bullying at some point during their school careers." Various studies show that students from lower socioeconomic backgrounds and students with disabilities experience bullying more often than other students.

Victims 
 Statistics show that in the U.S. school system 1 in 3 children are affected by bullying in their lifetime, and 30% report being involved in some manner.
 In a 1997 study of five Seattle high schools, students recorded their peers' hallway and classroom conversations. It was discovered that the average high school student hears about 25 anti-gay remarks a day.
 U.S. students who are homosexual, bisexual, or transgender are five times as likely to miss school because they feel unsafe after being bullied due to their sexual orientation.
 According to the U.S. Centers for Disease Control and Prevention, the percentage of gay, lesbian, and bisexual students who did not go to school at least one day during the 30 days preceding the survey, due to safety concerns, ranged from 11% to 30% for gay and lesbian students and 12% to 25% for bisexual students.
 61.1% of LGBT middle- or high-school students were more likely than their non-LGBT peers to feel unsafe or uncomfortable as a result of their sexual orientation.
 In the United States, a 2013 nationwide survey indicated that 20% of high school students were bullied on school property in the past year, 15% of the students were bullied electronically, and 8% of students ages 12–18 reported ongoing bullying on a weekly basis.
 According to the journal Evolutionary Psychological Science, victims of bullying are more likely to be sexually inactive compared to bullies.
 In a Canadian study that surveyed 2,186 students across 33 middle and high schools, 49.5% reported being bullied online in the previous three months. 33.7% of the sample reported being the perpetrator of cyberbullying.
 At least 1 in 3 adolescent students in Canada has reported being bullied.
 47% of Canadian parents report having a child who is a victim of bullying.
 The most common form of cyberbullying involved receiving threatening or aggressive emails or instant messages, reported by 73% of Canadian victims.
 A nationwide survey conducted by Trinity College Dublin, of bullying in first- and second-level schools in Ireland, estimates that some 31% of primary and 16% of secondary students have been bullied at some time.
 In a study of 32 Dutch elementary schools, 16.2% of the 2,766 participating children reported being bullied regularly (at least several times a month).

Statistics referencing the prevalence of bullying in schools may be inaccurate and tend to fluctuate. In a U.S. study of 5,621 students ages 12–18, 64% of the students had experienced bullying and did not report it.

Bullies 
 In a 2005 survey, 3,708,284 students reported being a perpetrator of bullying in the U.S. school system.
 Studies have shown bullies report having more friends than children who are victims.
 Bullying behavior in perpetrators is shown to decrease with age.
 Developmental research suggests bullies are often morally disengaged and use egocentric reasoning strategies.
 Bullies often come from families that use physical forms of discipline. Adolescents who experience violence or aggression in the home, or are influenced by negative peer relationships, are more likely to bully. This suggests that positive social relationships reduce the likelihood of bullying.
 Bullies may show signs of mental health disorders. This trend is most evident in adolescents diagnosed with depression, anxiety, or ADHD.
 Poor theory of mind is associated with bullying.
 Up to 25% of students may encourage bullying, and more than 50% will not intervene in bullying situations.
 A study by Lisa Garby shows that 60% of bullies in middle school will have at least one criminal conviction by the age of 24.
 10.6% of surveyed children said they sometimes bullied other children (moderate bullying), 8.8% said they had bullied others once a week or more (frequent bullying), and 13% said they had engaged in moderate or frequent bullying of others. 6.3% had experienced bullying and also been a bully.

School shootings 

Although research suggests that there might be a weak association between school bullying and school shootings, there is some evidence that having been a victim of school bullying is related to increased risk of a school shootings. The media have portrayed some individuals, such as Charles Andrew Williams, Eric Hainstock, Seung-Hui Cho, Eric Harris and Dylan Klebold, Luke Woodham, Michael Carneal, Wellington Menezes Oliveira, Karl Pierson, Jose Reyes, and Jeff Weise, as having experienced bullying and then becoming school shooters. However, research suggests that the vast majority of individuals who have been victims of bullying do not become school shooters.

Institutional prevention 
Studies have shown that bullying programs set up in schools with the engagement of staff and faculty have been shown to reduce peer victimization and bullying. Incidents of bullying are noticeably reduced when the students themselves disapprove of bullying. Classroom activities where students reflect on bullying decrease the cases of bullying while increasing the communication between students and school staff.

The current literature shows that school-based anti-bullying programs are also effective in reducing bullying perpetration and bullying victimization by ~15%, based on moderate-quality evidence. However, as there is variation in the effectiveness of anti-bullying programs, further research is required to identify specific programmatic features that make programs effective.

Measures such as instituting zero tolerance for fighting or placing troubled students in the same group or classroom are actually ineffective in reducing bullying. Methods that are effective include increasing empathy for victims; adopting a program that includes teachers, students, and parents; and having students lead anti-bullying efforts. Success is most associated with beginning interventions at an early age, constantly evaluating programs for effectiveness, and having some students take online classes to avoid bullies at school. Another way to help victims is to provide peer support. Peer support can help a victim improve his or her school performance.

Effective national responses 
Based on UNESCO case studies of six countries that have succeeded in reducing school violence and bullying (Eswatini, Italy, Jamaica, Lebanon, Republic of Korea and Uruguay) as well as two countries that have maintained low levels over time (the Netherlands and Sweden), there are a number of factors that contribute to effective national responses.

Factors that contribute to effective national responses include:

 Political leadership and high-level commitment, together with a robust legal and policy framework that addresses violence against children and school violence and bullying. Many successful countries also have an emphasis in national policies that promote a safe learning environment, a positive school and classroom climate, and a strong commitment to child rights and empowerment.
 Collaboration and partnerships. At the national level, this includes partnerships between the education sector and other sector ministries, civil society organizations, academic institutions, professional associations, and the media. At the school level, it includes partnerships involving all stakeholders in the school community, including head teachers, teachers, other staff, parents and students, local authorities, and professionals in other sectors. More specifically, the involvement of all students, including bystanders, and the use of peer approaches, have been a key factor in countries that have made the most progress.
 Evidence-based approaches, informed by accurate and comprehensive data and systematic evaluation of the effectiveness of existing programmes. Effective systems for routine reporting and monitoring of school violence and bullying and rigorous evaluation of the impact of programmes and interventions are critical. Bullying prevention programs that reach parents through trainings and material sent home, as well as role-playing scenarios that students can work through, have been found as relevant components to reduce the problem behavior according to research from David Finkelhor and colleagues from the University of New Hampshire's Crimes Against Children Center.
 Training and support for teachers and care and support for affected students. Training in successful countries has focused on developing skills to prevent and respond to school violence and bullying and to use positive approaches to classroom management.

The case studies also identified a number of factors that can limit the effectiveness and impact of national responses. These include lack of data on specific aspects of school violence and bullying and on the sub-groups of students who are most vulnerable, low coverage of interventions, lack of systematic monitoring of school violence and bullying, and of robust evaluation of the impact of programmes.

Anti-bullying legislation and court rulings

United Kingdom 
Section 89 of the Education and Inspections Act 2006 provides for an anti-bullying policy for all state schools to be made available to parents.

United States 
The victims of some school shootings have sued both the shooters' families and the schools. At one point only 23 states had anti-bullying laws. In 2015, Montana became the last state to enact an anti-bullying law. At that point, all 50 states had an anti-bullying law. These laws are not going to abolish bullying, but it does bring attention to the behavior, and they let the aggressors know it will not be tolerated.

Canada 
In 2016, a legal precedent was set by a mother and her son, after the son was bullied at his public school. The mother and son won a court case against the Ottawa-Carleton District School Board, making this the first case in North America where a school board has been found negligent in a bullying case for failing to meet the standard of care ("duty of care") that the school board owes to its students. A similar bullying case was won in Australia in 2013 (Oyston v. St. Patricks College).

Taiwan 
The Ministry of Education has launched a series of projects. In 2006, they started the 'anti-bully plan'. In 2008, they launched the "prevent-bully video from public project"—which included encouraging informants and monitoring the school—in the hope that it could improve education quality.

See also

References

Sources

Further reading 
 Harger, Brent (2016). "You Say Bully, I Say Bullied: School Culture and Definitions of Bullying in Two Elementary Schools." Education and Youth Today. Ed. Yasemin Besen-Cassino and Loretta E. Bass (Sociological Studies of Children and Youth, Volume 20) Emerald Group Publishing Limited, 2016. 91 – 121.
  
 Stuart W. Twemlow, Frank Sacco (2008). Why School Antibullying Programs Don't Work. Jason Aronson Inc, 
  - PhD dissertation - Info page

External links 

 StopBullying.gov
 School Bullying – Undergraduate research journal at Caldwell College
 Student Bullying: Overview of Research, Federal Initiatives, and Legal Issues Congressional Research Service
 STOP A BULLY: Canada's Anti-Bullying Report Service

 
Persecution
Bullying
Youth rights
Anti-bullying campaigns